University of Birmingham Medical School RFC (UBMSRFC), 'The Birmingham Medics' is an English Rugby Union club based in Birmingham who play in both the National Medical Schools Cup (which they are twice champions of) and the West Midlands Reserve Team League.

The club is formed primarily by medical and medical sciences students from the University of Birmingham, but also has numerous members studying other degree courses at the University of Birmingham.

The 1st XV has experience considerable success across its history, twice winning the National medical Schools Cup and twice beating the University of Birmingham 1st XV in the official Birmingham Rugby Varsity.
 
Alongside the 1st XV, the 2nd XV 'The Airsharks' regularly play on a Saturdays and Wednesdays against local university and club sides and have won the 'Brum Cup' (the University of Birmingham intramural rugby cup) on numerous occasions.

History 
Almost every Medical School in the United Kingdom has a rugby union team; some are as old as the game itself whereas others were formed much more recently. The rugby club at Birmingham Medical School was officially started in 1958 and is well established in both the sporting and social sides of Medical School life. However, there is evidence in the archives of a Medical School rugby team from 1921, however very little is known about this.

The Beginnings (1958-1969)

The Medical School rugby club, as it is known today, was founded in the 1958/59 season by Richard Donovan. There was a lot of support in the beginning by Peter Lea who remained as fixtures secretary for many years and John Barker who later became captain. The mood in which the club was formed was caught in the Queen’s Medical Magazine of 1960: "Nearly two years ago a few chaps decided it was time that the Medics stopped idly discussing their apathy concerning the lack of extramural activities and complaining about the Medical School being little more than a technical college with no thought for anything other than work and did something about it. As a result the Medical R.F.C. came into existence – Professor Smout put up the monies".

From this beginning, the club continued to thrive and a second team was formed in 1961 when Arnold Gourevitch was president. In the same year the club suffered a setback when it lost its Metchley Park ground to the University. However, a new ground was found on the side of an exposed hill on Billesely Common where there was only ever enough hot water to wash the first five players!

By the 1962/63 season a third team had been added and Dick Herbert had taken over the club captaincy. This season was successful as the club was undefeated against all Medical School rivals. The following season Charlie Gwyn became captain, with Roger Lee as President.

In the 1966/67 season, Piers Abson became captain and later was chosen to represent the Provincial Hospitals against the London Hospitals. This season also saw the club act as hosts to the Byron Evans seven-a-side tournament. This was a smoothly run affair with Presidents Frank McGuinness and Hugh Cameron providing advice to help with the occasion. Mac Rouse took over the captaincy for the 1967/68 and in this season the club had one hundred playing members and four sides.

One of the seasons in the 60's was the best season for several years with the First XV winning 15 out of 23 fixtures with most of the games being close affairs. One such game against Cardiff Medics saw Birmingham win about 80% of the ball but still lost the game 5-3. Players that deserve a special mention from this season include Don Thompson and John Booth from the forwards and Barling and Kenyon, two prolific wingers, scoring almost 50 tries between them. The Second XV had a less successful season winning 5, drawing 2 and losing 9 with Tony Oakhill captaining the side. The 3rd XV was the most successful team of the season winning 12 out of 16 games and were captained by Andy Johnston. During this time many consultants gave much support to assist this newly formed rugby club. These included Professor McLaren, Professor Marsland, Paul Dawson Edwards, Jo Jordan and Brian Pentecost.

The 1970s

The rugby club seemed to suffer a lull during the 1970s dropping back to running just two teams. The 1976/77 season saw a period of revival for the Medics rugby side. The results were largely satisfying with the 1st XV winning two thirds of the games played. However, the game against Manchester resulted in good wins for both the 1st and 2nd XVs. In the report for this season the perennial problem of fitness was brought up and stated that it was "essential that a better level of fitness be obtained...and it is vital that players attend the few turn-outs planned." The top scorers were J Fox (8 tries), G Percival (7) and T Debenham (5) with the kickers C Pattison (8 conversions, 2 penalties) and M Sissons (8 conv.) also contributing to the scoring.

Two teams also played regularly in the 1977/78 season with both winning over half of their games, the 1st XV winning six out of eleven scoring 210 points and conceding 177 and the 2nd XV winning four out of six games. Unfortunately, as with the previous season, several games were cancelled due to bad weather. An AGM was held on the 17th May, where matters discussed included the impending arrival of 40 new tops (royal blue with a gold hoop) costing £280. It was also agreed to use Wednesday afternoons for regular team training for the following season. As with the current day, funding was the only major problem with travelling and kit cited as the major costs. This season saw R Usher awarded the tankard for player of the year.

The 1980s

The 1980s saw a resurgence of Medics RFC and coincided with the 25th anniversary in 1983. In 1981 three teams were being run by the club, the 1st XV, 2nd XV and the Borborygmi's (3rd XV). These were then joined by a fourth XV, "The Claudicants", in 1982 as the club picked up momentum. This team was originally captained by Richard Emms with Nick Kane taking over the following season and was started to "fill a void for those players who could not get a regular game for the Borborygmi’s... defined the term ‘social side’".

During this period of time the 1st XV regularly played provincial Medical School including Southampton, Liverpool, Leicester, Nottingham and Leeds but had little to do with the London Medical Schools. Unfortunately for the 2nd XV "the ability of our Medical School’s Admissions Panel to select able and dedicated rugby players, does not seem to be shared by other Medical Schools" and so many of the other university sides were unable to put out two medics teams.

As well as the emergence of "The Claudicants", the 1982/83 was a successful season with the 1st XV, captained by Dave Bush, winning convincingly against Leeds, Southampton, Leicester and Manchester MedicalSchools. Also, having beaten Tony Butler's team of the month – Kings Norton, the club received a mention on BRMB (Birmingham's radio station). The 2nd XV, captained by Mervyn Davies only lost three games with the Borborygmi's having an unbeaten season.

The 1983/84 season saw Jim Goodman take over the 1st XV's captaincy. Unfortunately there were some changes to the fixture list during this season which caught the 1st XV off guard and a few more games than usual were lost. The 2nd XV skippered by Dave Ekbery only lost twice and the Claudicants played with a lot of spirit, despite not achieving the results that they would have liked. However, the biggest shock of the season was the first defeat of the Borborygmi's in thirty matches to Lichfield Friars. One player that should be singled out during this time is Dave Bush who was selected to play for the BMA England side against a BMA Scotland side, however the Scots ran out easy winners. It should be mentioned that they were captained by British Lion Dougie Morgan.

Training during the 1980s was a regular event with four sessions a week. Monday night consisted of a run with intermittent sprints along roads near the university and then back to the running track for sprints. Tuesday and Thursday were optional circuit training sessions at the Munrow sports centre with Wednesday night for team training and the occasional game. This took place at Wast Hills and was also where the rugby with club played their home games on a Saturday.

The following year the club took a trip to Jersey. The game saw the tourists, with a squad of about thirty, take on the Jersey 1st XV.

The 1980s also saw the Medical Sickness Society Annual Medical School 7's, which unfortunately no longer takes place. It was the only way for provincial Medical Schools to take on their rivals from both London and Scotland. Venues for this event included Edinburgh, Birmingham and Manchester with Birmingham winning the plate on one occasion.

The 1990s

The momentum and numbers of the club continued into the 1990s with three teams regularly playing and the Claudicants making an occasional appearance. One member describes how he saw the Claudicants style of rugby:"They usually played without boot laces and with champagne and cream cakes at half time. I don't think they were allowed to kick, either. This was not a Barbarians type of thing, more a realization that none of them could kick".

Until 1994 the games were usually against local sides with occasional Medical School opposition. However, in 1994 the Medical Schools cup was introduced. Birmingham won this in its inaugural year beating St Georges, London, in the final 14-13. Unfortunately they were unable to defend their title in 1995 losing to the eventual winners Cardiff in the semi-final.

In 1994 the club toured to Dublin and played the Guinness factory team. The theme this year was "pirates" ("Orange men" was deemed to be too dangerous!). The most unfortunate members of the club on this particular occasion were those members who did not tour and were handed ‘questionable’ pints of Guinness to drink in the student guild once the touring party had returned!

The 1999 tour saw the club travel to Benidorm. There the tourists took part in the Murcia University fifteens tournament, from which they emerged victorious. Another tournament followed, the La Villajoyosa fifteens, where the club also did very well with teams coming first and third. To top off the tour a full fifteen-a-side game was played against La Villajoyosa, a Spanish Premier League side at the time, which Birmingham won fifty points to ten.

The 2000s

Unfortunately in more recent years the numbers in the rugby club have fallen and it has only been possible to put out two teams regularly on a Saturday afternoon.

The 2005/06 season saw a strong first XV led by Nick Walder win their opening fixtures in the Medical Schools cup. Unfortunately due to fixture clashes and a lack of organisation the competition was never completed. This season saw the game against the University 1st XV on the Bournbrook pitch revived after a few years of absence. The medics put on a spirited display with many players having their game of the season. However, the University proved too strong in the end and ran out 22-10 winners.

The following season (2006/07) the 1st team was led by Guy Evans with Charles Daultry Chairman of the club. In the Medics cup, Birmingham won their group with easy wins over Warwick and Leicester although Nottingham had more resistance. This run of wins was ended in the quarter finals with a loss, by a point, to Leeds. Player of the season and players player were both awarded to Ben "Roids" Thompson who returned after the summer break three times the size of when he left! The second team during this season was led by Lyndon Wells and along with Mark Pell, brought back to life the tradition of the "AirSharks", a team name for the 2nd XV that was coined a few years previously when the captain at the time acquired a large shark from an away fixture.

Lyndon Wells made the step up from 2nd XV captain to Chairman during the fiftieth anniversary season, 2007-08. The 1st XV was led by Mike Bateman and the 2nd XV by Chris McLenachan. This season was a big improvement for the club in general. This began with a good freshers’ intake at the beginning of the season and was reinforced when training moved to a full floodlit pitch at Metchley. This move enhanced training greatly as for the last few years it had taken place on half a pitch by the Bournbrook Astroturf's which were regularly too flooded to play on. The increased numbers and better facilities meant that more people than in previous years trained regularly and this was reflected in results on the pitch. The 1st XV made it to the semifinal of the Medics cup before losing out to Peninsula Medical School 14-5. It should be pointed out that the kick off time was 11:00 to allow the team to travel back in time for the Medics Ball in the evening! This seasons player of the season was awarded to Viccan During for playing consistently well over his five years at Medical School.

Tours during the 2000s were as varied as previous decades from Norwich to Poland and Blackpool to Cork. The tour to Poland (2003/4) was a particular highlight, although the rugby was not so successful when Birmingham lost to Aber Olsztyn 97-7. However the opposition were a Polish premiership side at the time and Birmingham were the first English touring side to score a try against them, courtesy of Adie Morrison.

Present Day

In the 2012/13 season the 1st XV was captained by Will Belvins with Lloyd Collier as Chairman. This year saw the revival of the game against the University 1st XV on the final day of the Christmas term, under floodlights on the Bournbrook. In what was one of the most impressive performances seen by any Club side over recent time, the 1st XV ran out 15-11 winners in what was an incredible performance in front of over 1000. Unfortunately, after an impressive start in NAMS, we eventually lost out to Cardiff Medics in the semi-Final.

Brum Varsity 2012/13

The 2013/14 season saw massive change for the Club, with the entry into the West Midlands Reserve League Division 1, and also with a move to the Rowheath Pavilion in Bournville, due to increasing frustrations with the University's pitches. The 1st XV was once again led superbly by William Blevins. The first half of term saw the Club go 9 from 9, as well as going on the first tour in 4 years in an interesting Club tour to Newcastle. In a packed schedule after Christmas, the Club continued to dominate local sides but once again found themselves losing out at the semi-final stage in NAMS – this time to Sheffield.

Two more seasons followed, with the Club losing to Manchester Medics and then once again Old Foes Cardiff in successive NAMS semi-finals. It was decided to withdraw from the West Midlands Reserve League to concentrate on playing against Medical School sides. The numbers took an initial dip in 2013/14, with the failure to even field a 2nd XV (Arirsharks) side. Under the leadership of Chaz Hudson as captain, and with Tom Stevens as chairman in 2015/16, the Club were once again able to snatch victory from the University 1st XV on the Bournbrook in front of a huge crowd – with a winning try from Tom Stevens at some incredible defence at the death securing the victory 17-15.

Brum Varsity 2015/16

In the 2016-17 season Chaz Hudson became Chairman and stand-off Steffan Griffin became Captain. Despite losing out to a strong University 1st XV side after Christmas, some fantastic performances first in the quarter-finals against the Moose, and then a goliath victory against Leeds Medics in the semi-final, with a last minute of extra time penalty from Sam Bourke sending the Club into their first NAMS Final in recent memory. Unfortunately a huge Cardiff Medics side ultimately proved too much on the day, but it was fitting that the 10 leavers from that year all got the opportunity to wear the Griffin with pride in a national final. Special mention must go to Chaz Hudson, who scored nearly 50 tries for the Club despite being a toad. This year also saw a huge increase in the number of players, with two teams comfortably being fielded every week and fantastic flowing rugby constantly being played.

Just prior to start of the 2017–18 season and the 60th anniversary of "The Club",  came the sad news of the passing of old boy Dr Tom Oakland. In response and led by chairman Ronan Yeo, through a variety of fund raising efforts, over £5000 was raised in Tom's memory for C.A.L.M., a mental health charity. Despite a strong momentum of pride in the club during its 60th year, the 1st XV again fell in the semi-finals of the National Cup.

The 2018–19 season saw the opportunity for the 2nd XV to, just as the 1st XV did in their equivalent competition, win the inaugural National Medical Schools Cup. Captain Lewis Turner led a strong performance against Cardiff in the semi-finals, only to see the 2nd XV continue club traditions and crash out at this stage. Aidan Butler oversaw a strong fresher intake and Guy Foggitt was awarded 'Clubman of the year' as a result of his commitment during his five years of service including one and a half as the Airsharks' captain.

Past Chairmen and Captains 

British rugby union clubs